Kyle is a city in Hays County, Texas, United States. Its population grew from 28,016 in 2010 to 45,697 in 2020, making Kyle one of the fastest-growing cities in Texas.

Geography

Kyle is located in eastern Hays County at  (29.989080, –97.875947). It is bordered to the south by San Marcos and to the northwest by Mountain City.

The Blanco River runs through the western side of the city, while the central and eastern parts of the city drain east to Plum Creek. Both waterways are tributaries of the San Marcos River.

Education
Kyle is served by the Hays Consolidated Independent School District, with high-school students attending either Jack C. Hays High School, Lehman High School or Johnson High School. Also near Kyle, the Hays campus of the Austin Community College District  has been fully operational since 2014.

Transportation
Residents have access to I-35, SH 45 toll road, FM 150, FM 1626, SH 21, and SH 123. The MoPac rail line runs through downtown Kyle.

Highways

Government and infrastructure 

The city of Kyle is governed by a council-manager form of government. The city council consists of three members representing geographical districts, three at-large council members, and the mayor, who is also elected at-large. Each council member is elected to three-year terms.

State and federal representation 
The Management and Training Corporation operates the Kyle Unit, a prison for men in Kyle, on behalf of the Texas Department of Criminal Justice. In 1988, the construction of Kyle Unit, the first private prison for the TDCJ, sparked controversy.  The Kyle Unit became the second-largest employer in Kyle, after the Hays Consolidated Independent School District. In 1989, the prison had a $50,000 weekly payroll, with much of it going to the city's residents.

The United States Postal Service operates the Kyle Post Office.

History

The town was established on July 24, 1880, when David E. Moore and Fergus Kyle (for whom the town was named) deeded 200 acres for a townsite to the International-Great Northern Railroad. The new town drew residents and businesses from Mountain City, three miles west, and Blanco, four miles west. Tom Martin operated the first business in Kyle. The community's population exceeded 500 by 1882, but later declined. Kyle was incorporated in 1928 as a general-law city with a mayor and five council members. In 1937, Mary Kyle Hartson, daughter of Fergus Kyle, was elected mayor by a write-in vote. In the early 1940s, Kyle was noted as the only Texas town with an all-woman government.

From 1892 to 1901, Kyle was the childhood home of Pulitzer Prize-winning author Katherine Anne Porter. Many of her most famous short stories, such as "Noon Wine", are set in locations in and around Kyle. Her former home is now a writer's residence open to the public by appointment. The Katherine Anne Porter Literary Center hosts readings by visiting writers.

Demographics

As of the 2020 United States census, there were 45,697 people, 14,701 households, and 10,370 families residing in the city.

Of the 14,701 households, 54.2% had children under the age of 18 living with them, 59.8% were married couples living together, 13.7% had a female householder with no husband present, and 21.2% were not families. About 14.5% of all households were made up of individuals, and 2.6% had someone living alone who was 65 years of age or older. The average household size was 3.15, and the average family size was 3.51; 391 persons in the city lived in group quarters rather than households.

In the city, the age distribution was 33.7% under  18, 7.4% were from 18 to 24, 37.1% from 25 to 44, 17.6% from 45 to 64, and 4.2% were 65 or older. The median age was 30.2 years. For every 100 females, there were 99.0 males. For every 100 females age 18 and over, there were 96.0 males.

For 2012–2016, the estimated median annual income for a household was $72,191, and for a family was $76,992. Male full-time workers had a median income of $50,235 versus $39,474 for females. The per capita income for the town was $25,348. About 6.8% of the population and 5.4% of families were below the poverty line; 7.3% of the population under the age of 18 and 7.7% of those 65 or older were living in poverty.

Pie in the Sky Hot Air Balloon Festival 

The Kyle Pie in the Sky Hot Air Balloon Festival has been an annual event in Kyle on Labor Day weekend since 2017 and attracts thousands of visitors from all over the state and outside of Texas. The event features morning hot air balloon "mass ascensions” where balloons take off at sunrise flying over Kyle on Saturday and Sunday morning, as well as “glows” in the evenings, where tethered hot air balloons glow against the evening sky at Lake Kyle. Aside from glows and morning flights, the festival will also light up the night sky with two fireworks shows on Friday and Saturday night.

Every year, Pie in the Sky also features pie eating contests, a pie baking contest, a Pie Café, a vendor market with artisan crafts, unique products and food, libations, live music performances throughout the weekend, a children's zone with activities and the Gathering of the Kyles—the city of Kyle's annual attempt at the Guinness World Record for the most people with the same name in one place.

Notable people
 Fitzhugh Andrews, composer
 Gary Clark Jr., musician
 Otto Hofmann, organ builder
 Edwin Jackson Kyle, U.S. Ambassador to Guatemala (1945–48), namesake of Kyle Field
 Helen Michaelis, expert on Quarter Horses, first woman inducted into the American Quarter Horse Hall of Fame
 Katherine Anne Porter, author

Gallery

References

Further reading

External links

 City of Kyle official website
 
 Kyle Area Chamber of Commerce & Visitor's Bureau
 Kyle Economic Development
 Kyle tourism website
 Kyle Fair, Bull Ride, and Music Fest
 Katherine Anne Porter Literary Center
 Michaelis Ranch History – Early history of Kyle, and one of the oldest surviving ranches in the area

Cities in Texas
Cities in Hays County, Texas
Cities in Greater Austin